Capital Credit Union Park is a multi-purpose stadium in Ashwaubenon, Wisconsin, a suburb of Green Bay. The stadium is home to the Green Bay Rockers of the Northwoods League, a collegiate summer baseball league; the Green Bay Voyageurs FC of USL League Two; and a variety of community athletic and social events. The Voyageurs christened the stadium with a 3–0 win over WSA Winnipeg on the morning of June 1, 2019 in a game postponed a day by rain. Later that day, the baseball team, then named the Green Bay Booyah, lost their inaugural home opener 12–6 to the Wisconsin Rapids Rafters.

For baseball, site constraints limit the distances to center and right field, a problem addressed with a high outfield wall. The height of the wall was announced as 19-feet, 19-inches in a nod to the nearby Green Bay Packers' inaugural season in 1919, but it has also been reported as 22 feet. The wall is made of shipping containers, chosen as being relatively inexpensive and able to handle a high wind load. Going along with the baseball team's 2019–2021 name, the ballpark features the world's largest booyah kettle (2,000 gallons).

Baseball team owner Big Top Baseball has committed to a 23-year lease, paying $500,000 up-front and $205,000 annually for five years followed by 1% increases annually for the remaining years.

References

External links
 
 Green Bay Rockers
 Northwoods League

Baseball venues in Wisconsin
Buildings and structures in Brown County, Wisconsin
2018 establishments in Wisconsin
Soccer venues in Wisconsin
Sports venues in Green Bay, Wisconsin